The 2021–22 ISU Short Track Speed Skating World Cup is a multi-race tournament over a season for short track speed skating. The season began on 21 October 2021 in China and ended on 28 November 2021 in Netherlands. The World Cup is organised by the ISU who also runs world cups and championships in speed skating and figure skating.

The World Cup consisted of four competitions this year.

Calendar

Men

Beijing 21–24 October 2021

Nagoya 28–31 October 2021

Debrecen 18–21 November 2021

Dordrecht 25–28 November 2021

Women

Beijing 21–24 October 2021

Nagoya 28–31 October 2021

Debrecen 18–21 November 2021

Dordrecht 25–28 November 2021

Mixed

Beijing 21–24 October 2021

Nagoya 28–31 October 2021

Debrecen 18–21 November 2021

Dordrecht 25–28 November 2021

World Cup standings

See also
 Short track speed skating at the 2022 Winter Olympics
 2022 World Short Track Speed Skating Championships

Notes

References

External links 
 ISU.org World Cup Schedule
 Official results

ISU Short Track Speed Skating World Cup
Isu Short Track Speed Skating World Cup, 2021–22
Isu Short Track Speed Skating World Cup, 2021–22